X-ray CT scan can refer to the following Wikipedia articles: 

CT scan - makes use of computer-processed combinations of many X-ray images taken from different angles to produce cross-sectional (tomographic) images (virtual "slices") of specific areas of a scanned object, allowing the user to see inside the object without cutting.
Industrial computed tomography - any computer-aided tomographic process, usually x-ray computed tomography, that (like its medical imaging counterparts) uses irradiation (usually with x-rays) to produce three-dimensional representations of the scanned object both externally and internally
Medical imaging - the technique and process of creating visual representations of the interior of a body for clinical analysis and medical intervention, as well as visual representation of the function of some organs or tissues
X-ray computed tomography - makes use of computer-processed combinations of many X-ray images taken from different angles to produce cross-sectional (tomographic) images (virtual "slices") of specific areas of a scanned object, allowing the user to see inside the object without cutting.